The 2013–14 Carolina Hurricanes season was the franchise's 42nd season, its 35th season in the National Hockey League (NHL) since the NHL franchise was granted on June 22, 1979, and 16th season since the franchise relocated from Hartford to start the 1997–98 seasons.

The Hurricanes failed to qualify for the Stanley Cup playoffs for the fifth straight year.

Standings

Schedule and results

Pre-season

Regular season

Player stats 
Final Stats 
Skaters

Goaltenders

†Denotes player spent time with another team before joining the Hurricanes. Stats reflect time with the Hurricanes only.
‡Denotes player was traded mid-season. Stats reflect time with the Hurricanes only.
Bold/italics denotes franchise record.

Transactions 

The Hurricanes have been involved in the following transactions during the 2013–14 season.

Trades

Free agents acquired

Free agents lost

Claimed via waivers

Lost via waivers

Lost via retirement

Player signings

Draft picks

Carolina Hurricanes' picks at the 2013 NHL Entry Draft, which was held in Newark, New Jersey on June 30, 2013.

Draft notes

 The Carolina Hurricanes' second-round pick went to the Buffalo Sabres as the result of a June 30, 2013, trade that sent Andrej Sekera to the Hurricanes in exchange for Jamie McBain and this pick.
 The Carolina Hurricanes' fourth-round pick went to the Edmonton Oilers (via Los Angeles), the Hurricanes traded this pick to the Los Angeles Kings as the result of a January 13, 2013, trade that sent Kevin Westgarth to the Hurricanes in exchange for Anthony Stewart, 2014 sixth-round pick and this pick.
 The Carolina Hurricanes' seventh-round pick went to the Tampa Bay Lightning as the result of an April 2, 2013, trade that sent Marc-Andre Bergeron to the Hurricanes in exchange for Adam Hall and this pick.

References

Carolina Hurricanes seasons
Carolina Hurricanes season, 2013-14
Car
Hurr
Hurr